The Remi were an ancient Belgic tribe.

Remi may also refer to:

People 
 Georges Prosper Remi (1907–1983), a Belgian comic book writer and artist, best known for his comic The Adventures of Tintin, better known as "Hergé"
 Jose Vega Santana (born 1958), a famous clown in Puerto Rico known by the stage name "Remi"
 Maria Creveling (1995–2019), an American esports player who briefly competed under the in-game name "Remi"
 Rémi Coulom (born 1974), a French computer scientist
 Rémi Gaillard (born 1975), a French humorist
 Remi Rough (fl. 1980s–2008), an English street artist
 Remi Wolf (born 1996), American musician
 Saint Remigius (437–533), often called Saint Remi

Arts and media

Characters 
 Remi Hoshikawa, a character from Chikyuu Sentai Fiveman
 Remi Otogiri, a character from Groove On Fight in the Power Instinct series
 Rémi, the poor orphan boy, the title character in Hector Malot's 19th-century novel Sans Famille
 Remi, the protagonist of different anime adaptations of the French novel Sans Famille
 Remilia Scarlet, a.k.a. Remi, a character from the video game Touhou Project

Other uses in arts and media 
Remi (award), award from the WorldFest-Houston International Film Festival 
 Remi (band), an Australian hip hop duo

Science and technology 
 Refraction microtremor, sometimes abbreviated ReMi
 Restriction enzyme mediated integration, a technique for integrating DNA
 Remi, a Linux software repository for the latest versions of PHP
 REMI (Remote Integration Model), a set of tools and practices in broadcast engineering to produce live events (e.g. sports) remotely without sending personnel on site

Other uses 
 Rem (mythology), an Egyptian god sometimes called Remi

See also 
 Remy (disambiguation)